Mount Namuli is the second highest mountain in Mozambique and the highest in the Province of Zambezia. The Namuli massif consists of a level plateau with the granite dome of Mount Namuli above. The area was historically clad in tropical rainforest and is an important biodiversity hotspot with many endemic species of animals and plants. The lower slopes are now mainly used for the cultivation of tea and the middle slopes for other agricultural purposes, with indigenous forest now mostly restricted to the higher parts and corridors along water courses.

Geography
Mount Namuli is the highest peak in the Zambezia Province of Mozambique. At 2,420 metres it is the second highest mountain of Mozambique behind the Monte Binga. The Namuli massif consists of a level plateau which rises 700 to 800 metre. The granite dome of the Namuli rises 1,600 metre above the plateau. The area above 1,200 metre measures 50 x 30 km. Mount Namuli is located 12 km north-east of Gurué and about 160 km from the Mulanje Massif in south-eastern Malawi.

The forests of Mount Namuli are an important biodiversity hotspot which means that they have a high biodiversity rate of threatened animals and plant taxa. Species like the Namuli apalis (Apalis lynesi) and the Vincent's bush squirrel (Paraxerus vincenti) are endemic to Mount Namuli. Other rare species are the Thyolo alethe (Alethe choloensis) and the dapple-throat (Modulatrix orostruthus) which occur elsewhere too.

The lower slopes of Mount Namuli are dominated by tea plantations. The middle slopes are agrarian oriented. Indigenous forests are confined to corridors along stream courses. The nearest town is Gurúè which is the largest tea estate of Mozambique.

History
Mount Namuli was first explored in August 1886 by Henry Edward O'Neill who was the British consul in Mozambique in 1879. It became notable in ornithological circles for the expedition by Hubert Lynes and Jack Vincent in 1931/1932. Due to the Mozambican Civil War and poor road access, it was not until 1998 when a South African team of ornithologists were able to explore the forests of Mount Namuli.

References
 The birds of Namuli, northern Mozambique: retracing Vincent's footsteps
 New records of Ficus (Moraceae) species emphasize the conservation significance of inselbergs in Mozambique PDF, online
 Jack Vincent: The Namuli Mountains, Portuguese East Africa In: The Geographical Journal, Vol. 81, No. 4 (Apr., 1933), p. 314-327

 Timberlake, J.R., Dowsett-Lemaire, F., Bayliss, J., Alves T., Baena, S., Bento, C., Cook, K., Francisco, J., Harris, T., Smith, P. & de Sousa, C. (2009). Mt Namuli, Mozambique: Biodiversity and Conservation. Report produced under the Darwin Initiative Award 15/036. Royal Botanic Gardens, Kew, London. 114 p. 

Namuli
Namuli
Namuli
Important Bird Areas of Mozambique
Inselbergs of Africa